A platter is a large flat dish or plate, typically oval or circular in shape, used for serving a meal or course.  

In restaurant terminology, a platter is often a main dish served on a platter with one or more side dishes, such as a salad or french fries.

Notable platters includes the Colombian bandeja paisa, Indian thali or Arabic mixed-meat platters.

See also
 Thali
 In a basket
 Blue-plate special
 List of restaurant terminology
 Meat and three

External links

Crockery
Restaurant terminology
Serving and dining
Dinner